Haplosyllis is a genus of annelids belonging to the family Syllidae.

The genus has cosmopolitan distribution.

Species:

Haplosyllis aciculata 
Haplosyllis agelas 
Haplosyllis amphimedonicola 
Haplosyllis anthogorgicola 
Haplosyllis aplysinicola 
Haplosyllis aurantiaca 
Haplosyllis basticola 
Haplosyllis brevicirra 
Haplosyllis carmenbritoae 
Haplosyllis cephalata 
Haplosyllis chaetafusorata 
Haplosyllis chamaeleon 
Haplosyllis crassicirrata 
Haplosyllis cratericola 
Haplosyllis djiboutiensis 
Haplosyllis eldagainoae 
Haplosyllis giuseppemagninoi 
Haplosyllis granulosa 
Haplosyllis gula 
Haplosyllis imajimai 
Haplosyllis ingensicola 
Haplosyllis lattigae 
Haplosyllis leylae 
Haplosyllis loboi 
Haplosyllis navasi 
Haplosyllis nicoleae 
Haplosyllis niphatesicola 
Haplosyllis ohma 
Haplosyllis orientalis 
Haplosyllis rosenalessoae 
Haplosyllis sanchoi 
Haplosyllis sandii 
Haplosyllis spongicola 
Haplosyllis spongiphila 
Haplosyllis streptocephala 
Haplosyllis tenhovei 
Haplosyllis trifalcata 
Haplosyllis uncinigera 
Haplosyllis villogorgicola

References

Syllidae
Annelid genera